Anthony Michael 'Tony' Gough (born 18 March 1940) is an English former professional footballer.

Career
Gough captained Hereford United to a famous 2–1 victory over First Division side Newcastle United. He also played for Bristol Rovers and Swindon Town in the Football League.

References

1940 births
Living people
English footballers
Association football midfielders
Bath City F.C. players
Bristol Rovers F.C. players
Trowbridge Town F.C. players
Frome Town F.C. players
Swindon Town F.C. players
Torquay United F.C. players
Welton Rovers F.C. players
Melksham Town F.C. players
English Football League players